Matthew Corcoran (born February 17, 2006) is an American soccer player who plays as a midfielder for USL Championship club Birmingham Legion FC.

Club career
Corcoran began his career with the Dallas Texans before joining the youth academy at FC Dallas. In November 2020, he was called-up to train with the FC Dallas reserve side, North Texas SC. On April 24, 2021, he made his senior debut for North Texas SC in their USL League One opener against Fort Lauderdale CF, coming on as a 59th minute substitute in a 4–2 victory.

On January 14, 2022, Corcoran signed with Birmingham Legion FC of the USL Championship. On May 28 2022, he made his debut against Red Bull New York II as a 88th minute substitute in a 2-1 victory.

Career statistics

Club

References

External links
 Profile at FC Dallas

2006 births
Living people
Soccer players from Dallas
American soccer players
Association football midfielders
North Texas SC players
USL League One players
Birmingham Legion FC players